Christopher Frederick may refer to:

Christopher Frederick (producer), of Man in the Sand 
Sir Christopher St John Frederick, 11th Baronet (born 1950), of the Frederick baronets